Brian Banks may refer to:

 Brian Banks (American football) (born 1985), American football player
 Brian Banks (film), an American biographical drama film
 Brian Banks (baseball) (born 1970), American baseball player
 Brian Banks (politician) (born 1976), former member of the Michigan House of Representatives
 Brian Banks, musician with The Beepers